Ixtlilxochitl can refer to a number of Mesoamerican nobles, including:
Ixtlilxochitl I, tlatoani (ruler) of the central Mexican city-state of Texcoco from 1409 to 1418.
Ixtlilxochitl II, placed on the throne of Texcoco by Hernan Cortés in 1520, and a great-grandson of Ixtlilxochitl I.
Fernando de Alva Cortés Ixtlilxochitl (1568? 1578? - c. 1650), an indigenous Mexican nobleman, historian and author, descendant of Ixtlilxochitl I and Ixtlilxochitl II.

 Ixtlilxochitl can also refer to
Codex Ixtlilxochitl, historical Mesoamerican document authored by Fernando de Alva Cortés Ixtlilxochitl
Ixtlilxochitl, an alleged ancient Native American historian (See article on Jaredites).